Louis Marshall Martin (November 25, 1863 – March 1940) was an American lawyer and politician from New York.

Life
He was born on November 25, 1863, in Madison, Madison County, New York. He attended school and worked on the family farm. He graduated from Hamilton Union School in 1880, and from Clinton Grammar School in 1885. From 1887 to 1890, he taught school, and read law. In 1888, he was elected a Justice of the Peace in the Town of Kirkland. In 1889, he married M. Louise Foucher (1869–1956). He was Principal of the Clinton Public School from 1889 to 1890 when he was admitted to the bar. He practiced law in Clinton, and entered politics as a Republican.

Martin was a member of the New York State Assembly (Oneida Co., 2nd D.) in 1898, 1899 and 1900; and was Chairman of the Committee on Internal Affairs of Towns and Counties in 1900. Afterwards he was a Deputy New York Attorney General.

He was again a member of the State Assembly in 1916, 1917, 1918, 1919, 1920 and 1921. He was Chairman of the Committee on the Judiciary from 1920 to 1921, and as such presided over the trial of the five Socialist assemblymen in 1920 which ended with their expulsion from the Assembly.

Martin was a justice of the New York Supreme Court (5th D.) from 1922 to 1926 when he resigned because of ill health.

He died on March 1, 1940, in St. Elizabeth's Hospital in Utica, New York; and was buried at the Sunset Hill Cemetery in Clinton.

Sources

External links

1863 births
1940 deaths
People from Madison, New York
Republican Party members of the New York State Assembly
New York Supreme Court Justices
People from Clinton, Oneida County, New York